Iddo may refer to:
 Iddo (prophet), a minor Hebrew prophet
 Iddo, Florida, an unincorporated community in Florida
 Iddo, a fictional dog in The Magician's Elephant
 Iddo Island, in Lagos, Nigeria
 Iddo-Okpella, a village in Nigeria
 Iddo-Caddays, a town in Somalia
 "Iddo Bridge", a poem by Nigerian poet J. P. Clark

Given name 
 Iddo Goldberg, actor
 Iddo Netanyahu, physician, author and playwright
 Iddo Patt, filmmaker and television advertiser

See also 
 Ido (disambiguation)